Krom Phra Ratchawang Bowon Sathan Mongkhon , colloquially known as the Front Palace, was the title of the uparaja of Siam, variously translated as "viceroy", "vice king" or "Lord/Prince of the Front Palace", as the titleholder resided in the physical residence of the same name. The office of Front Palace was considered second only to the king and regarded as the heir presumptive. The name, with its dual meaning, originated in the Ayutthaya period, and the holder later gained significant powers during the Rattanakosin period. Front Palace occupants were usually a son or brother of the reigning monarch. The office existed until the death of the last occupant, Prince Vichaichan, in 1885. King Chulalongkorn then abolished the office of an heir presumptive, introducing in its stead the Western concept of a crown prince as heir apparent, and styled the new office "Crown Prince of Siam".

Ayutthaya period
The Uparaja or Uparat concept of a Viceroy was of Greater Indian origin. In 1448, Sukhothai King Trailokanat was crowned as the king of Ayutthaya, uniting the two kingdoms. During the 15th century, the Kingdom of Sukhothai, which centered on Pitsanulok, served as the seat of most of Uparats, as they were, with few exceptions, also king of Sukhothai. After the first fall of Ayutthaya in 1569, Maha Thammaracha crowned his son Naresuan as Uparat and king of Sukhothai/Pitsanulok. Naresuan then had a palace built in front of his Royal Palace, to be his son's place of residence when visiting Ayutthaya—thereby giving rise to the name "Front Palace." In 1583, Naresuan annexed the Sukhothai kingdom to Ayutthaya, and Pitsanulok ceased to be the seat of the Uparat. After his coronation, Naresuan appointed his brother Ekathotsarot to be the Uparat, stating that his brother in the Front Palace had equal status to the King in the Royal Palace.

Phetracha in 1688 appointed his son Luang Sorasak (later Sanpet VIII) as the Uparat living at the Front Palace. For the first time the descriptive term used was "Krom Phrarajawang Bovorn Sathan Mongkol" ( (lit. The Great Auspicious Place). The Uparat was usually the brother of the king, and only heir presumptive to the throne, not heir apparent. This created an air of uncertainty about the succession upon the death of the king; keeping the heir close at hand in the Great Auspicious Place proved a means for keeping an eye on him, lest he presume too much. When the Uparat died before the king, the title often remained vacant for several years, until the King deigns to appoint a new vice-king.

Rattanakosin period

With the foundation of the Chakri dynasty in 1782, Phutthayotfa Chulalok made his younger brother Bunma the Front Palace (as Maha Sura Singhanat). Maha Sura Singhanat supervised the construction of Front Palace in Bangkok. Later Front Palaces continued the expansion of the palace. Prince Isarasundhorn was the only Front Palace who did not reside in the Front Palace but instead lived at the Thonburi Palace. Ironically, with the exception of Prince Isarasundhorn (who succeeded to the throne as Phutthaloetla Naphalai), none of the Rattanakosin Front Palaces were actually crowned as they were mostly the monarch's siblings. During this time the Vice-King resided in the Front Palace (วังหน้า: Wang Na) north of the Grand Palace, which is now the main building of the Bangkok National Museum.

The Front Palaces during the Rattanakosin period wielded great power, with their own private army and even a navy. In 1851, King Mongkut made his brother Pinklao the Front Palace and then crowned him as a King equal in rank to himself, as was the case of Naresuan and Ekatotsarot. Pinklao also received all the styles and titles usually reserved only for the monarch; to Europeans he refers to himself as the Second King. In 1868, after the coronation of young Chulalongkorn, Sri Suriyawongse his regent arranged the grant of the title of Front Palace to Pinklao's son Prince Yingyot, as Front Palace Bovorn Vichaichan.

Though the office had been superseded, Mahidol Adulyadej, the Prince Father was posthumously given an equivalent rank.

End to the system

The conflicts between the reformist King Chulalongkorn and conservative Vice King came to a head in the so-called Front Palace Crisis in 1874—a fire in the Grand Palace was attributed to the Vice-King Bovorn Vichaicharn, who sought protection in the British consulate. The crisis started due to the fast-paced reforms started by the young King Chulalongkorn. As a result, the reforms were stalled for several years, and when the Vice-King died in 1885 the whole Uparath system was abolished by the King. Instead he named his son as heir and Crown Prince.

List of Front Palace lords

Ayutthaya

Thonburi

Rattanakosin

With the death of Vichaichan, Chulalongkorn did not appoint any new Front Palaces. In 1886, Chulalongkorn made his son Prince Maha Vajirunhis, "Crown Prince of Siam", therefore abolishing the title of Front Palace altogether.

See also
 Rear Palace—deputy viceroy of Siam
 1924 Palace Law of Succession
Uparaja—for other South East Asian equivialents
Crown Prince of Thailand
Chakri Dynasty
Monarchy of Thailand
Prince Vajirunhis the First Crown Prince of Siam

References

 
Thai monarchy
15th-century establishments in Thailand
1885 disestablishments in Siam